Grenouer is a Russian rock and metal band, formed in late 1992 in Perm. Their name is an intentional misspelling of grimoire, a magic textbook.

History  

The debut was followed by other albums, released in Russia by labels like Irond, More Hate, Blacksmith Productions, and Metallism, further developing their death metal approach. The third album, The Odour O' Folly, included a heavy cover version of A-Ha's "Take On Me". The fourth album Presence With War lyrically dealt with the Iraq-related war issues; its front cover was made by Mickmo, an American creator of comic books. Grenouer "is the most impressive metal statement from an unlikely source," Steve Beebee wrote in 2009, reviewing the album for Kerrang! and giving it a 4K-rating. 
  
In the mid-2000s, Grenouer’s music began to change dramatically and at the same period musicians also relocated to Saint Petersburg. Preference was given to hardcore, math metal and even progressive rock. The fifth album Try was released worldwide in Great Britain by Casket Music (a division of Copro Records), that displayed these influences yet some fans of brutal death metal felt as if Grenouer was betraying their ideals. In fact they were just pioneering the genre that today has the term djent. This did not stop musicians from further experiments and the next album, Lifelong Days, was recorded with the platinum selling Finnish producer Anssi Kippo at the Astia Studios. Released by the Spanish label Locomotive Records, it showcased Grenouer’s new approach to merging extreme metal with rock riffing. "Unforgiving to the end, this is metal at its most genuinely ferocious," Kerrang!s Ryan Bird wrote of Presence With War (released in 2009 in the UK) in another 4K-rating review.

Grenouer has toured inside and outside Russia and participated in big open air festivals. Grenouer has shared the same stage with Testament, Pro Pain, Textures, TesseracT, Anathema, Cradle of Filth, Entombed, Napalm Death, All Shall Perish, Behemoth, Cephalic Carnage, Despised Icon, Hate, Neurosis, Pain, Primordial, Soilwork, Sworn Enemy, The Berzerker, Tiamat, Trail of Tears, Warbringer, and many others.

Grenouer's seventh album, Blood on the Face, was released worldwide in 2013, in Europe on May 3, and North America on July 9 through Mausoleum Records. It was recorded with different producers – Finnish Anssi Kippo, at the Astia Studios and Italians Dualized and Eddy Cavazza, at dysFUNCTION Productions. Dualized made mixing at Zeta Factory Studios and afterwards the material got mastered at the Finnvox Studio by Mika Jussila. The sound of the album has shed extreme metal sounds in favour of modern rock and alternative metal.

Grenouer's songs are featured on various compilations including "Adrenaline 2: Rush Hour", a soundtrack to computer game.

Controversy
In 2004, the Mayor of Kemerovo banned Grenouer's concert the very same day they arrived at the city, allegedly for the advocacy of violence.

Line-up  
 Ind – vocals
 Motor – guitar
 Al Bolo – bass
 Danny D – drums

Discography 
 1993 – Death of a Bite (demo)
 1996 – Fiery Swans EP
 1996 – Border of Misty Times
 1999 – Gravehead
 2001 – The Odour O'Folly
 2004 – Presence With War
 2005 – Try EP
 2007 – Try
 2008 – Lifelong Days
 2011 – Computer Crime EP
 2013 – Blood on the Face
 2015 – Unwanted Today
 2019 – Ambition 999

References

External links 
 Grenouer official web site
 Grenouer MySpace page
 Grenouer Youtube channel
 Grenouer on iTunes
 Grenouer Interview with Metal Rules
 More Reviews and Interviews

Russian death metal musical groups
Russian technical death metal musical groups
Musical groups established in 1992
Musical quartets
Locomotive Music artists